Herbert Calvin Gruber (December 22, 1901 – February 1, 1979) was an American football player.  

Gruber was born in 1901 at Shelbyville, Kentucky. He attended Louisville Male High School. He was selected as an all-state player and served as captain of the 1919 Louisville team. He played college football at the University of Kentucky. 

Gruber played professional football as an end for the Louisville Brecks in the National Football League (NFL). He appeared in eight NFL games, seven as a starter, during the 1921, 1922 and 1923 seasons. 

After his football career was over, Gruber worked for the Jefferson County Boar of Education and Gulf Oil Co. He died in 1979 in Louisville, Kentucky, at age 77.

References

1901 births
1979 deaths
Louisville Brecks players
People from Shelbyville, Kentucky
Players of American football from Kentucky
Kentucky Wildcats football players